Ta' Xbiex Sports Club is a Maltese sports club that plays football in the National Amateur League, from the central locality of Ta' Xbiex. They finished seventh in group A, in the inaugural Amateur League season. Ta' Xbiex was previously represented in the Third Division by Ta' Xbiex F.C. until they were removed from the league and replaced by Mtarfa F.C. after a string of poor performances.

Current squad

References

External links
 Official Facebook page

Football clubs in Malta
2012 establishments in Malta
Ta' Xbiex
Association football clubs established in 2012